Loch Ness Football Club is a Scottish football club playing in the North Caledonian Football League currently based in the town of Fortrose in the Scottish Highlands.

History 
Loch Ness were formed in 1999 by current manager Shane Carling, and for 20 years played as members of the welfare/amateur recreational leagues of Inverness & District. The club formed a senior team in 2020, and were accepted as members of the North Caledonian Football Association, joining a temporary second tier of the association, known as the Ness Cup League. From 2021-22, they will play in the re-combined North Caledonian League.

During the summer of 2020, the club received widespread acknowledgement via social media after releasing prototypes for their new kits, which featured the Loch Ness Monster in the pattern. The designs were subsequently used and made by Lancashire company Zero Negativity Clothing, receiving orders worldwide upon release. As part of a sponsorship deal with WooHa Brewing Company, the sponsor created a limited edition lager named for the club.

Loch Ness played their first game in the Ness Cup League on 17 October. Their debut in the senior ranks resulted in an emphatic 11–1 win over Scourie, another team making their debut in the league, with hat-tricks from DJ MacPhee and Luke Seago.

In November, the club enlisted the help of former Clachnacuddin manager Iain Polworth to assist in coaching the side. The side finished 4th in League 2 when the season was curtailed.

In the 2021–22 season Loch Ness were pipped to the league title by Invergordon, ultimately finishing 2nd.

Ground 
Although the club has no fixed ground, they played their first season (2020–21) at Canal Park in Inverness, the regular home of Highland Rugby Club. 
For the 2021–22 campaign, they are playing their home games at King George V Park in Fortrose.

References

External links 
 Loch Ness F.C. official website

North Caledonian Football League teams
1999 establishments in Scotland
Football clubs in Inverness
Association football clubs established in 1999